Vladimir Anatolyevich Vokhmyanin (born 27 January 1962) is a Kazakhstani sport shooter.

He was born in Temirtau. He won two Olympic bronze medals in 25 metre rapid fire pistol; one at the 1992 Summer Olympics for the Unified Team and one at the 1996 Summer Olympics for Kazakhstan. He also finished 21st in 1988 and 12th in 2000. He trained at Dynamo in Alma-Ata.

References

External links
 

1962 births
Living people
People from Temirtau
Soviet male sport shooters
Kazakhstani male sport shooters
ISSF pistol shooters
Shooters at the 1988 Summer Olympics
Olympic shooters of the Soviet Union
Shooters at the 1992 Summer Olympics
Olympic shooters of the Unified Team
Olympic bronze medalists for the Unified Team
Shooters at the 1996 Summer Olympics
Shooters at the 2000 Summer Olympics
Olympic shooters of Kazakhstan
Olympic bronze medalists for Kazakhstan
Olympic medalists in shooting
Asian Games medalists in shooting
Shooters at the 1994 Asian Games
Shooters at the 1998 Asian Games
Shooters at the 2002 Asian Games
Shooters at the 2006 Asian Games
Medalists at the 1996 Summer Olympics
Medalists at the 1992 Summer Olympics
Asian Games gold medalists for Kazakhstan
Asian Games silver medalists for Kazakhstan
Asian Games bronze medalists for Kazakhstan
Medalists at the 1994 Asian Games
Medalists at the 1998 Asian Games
Medalists at the 2006 Asian Games
Kazakhstani people of Russian descent